Kate Beynon (born 9 September 1970, in Hong Kong) is an Australian contemporary artist based in Melbourne. She was the 2016 winner of the Geelong Contemporary Art Prize for the painting, Graveyard scene/the beauty and sadness of bones.

Her work addresses ideas of transcultural life, feminism, and notions of hybridity in today’s world. She is known for her depictions of the Chinese heroine Li Ji, who is situated in a modern context. Through Li Ji, Beynon explores a hybrid Australian existence and a sense of belonging within a mixed and multi-layered identity. Beynon is currently doing a PhD in Fine Art by Research at Monash University.

Early life and education 
Beynon was born to a Chinese-Malaysian mother and a Welsh father in Hong Kong. Her family emigrated from Hong Kong in 1974 and settled in Melbourne, Australia. She attended the University of Melbourne in 1989 and graduated from the Victorian College of the Arts in 1993 with a BFA.

Career 
Beynon graduated from Melbourne’s Victorian College of Arts in 1993, and has held over 25 solo exhibitions. Beynon has participated in-group exhibitions internationally. She has also participated in major feminist art shows, including Global Feminisms (2007) and The F Word, Contemporary Feminist Art in Australia (2014). In 1995, Beynon travelled to Beijing to study Mandarin. While she was there, she discovered the story of Li Ji through a Chinese/English language textbook. In 2004, Beynon was awarded with the Professional Development Grant from the Visual arts funds of Australia council for a residency in Harlem, New York. She was also granted the Arts Victoria, International Program in 2012 to exhibit in India. Beynon has been an eight-time Archibald Prize finalist in 2006, 2010, 2011, 2012, 2014, 2016, 2017 and 2020.

Beynon is represented by Sutton Gallery in Melbourne, where she has been exhibiting since 1996, and Milani Gallery in Brisbane. Beynon’s work is included in public collections across the world.

Artwork 
Having immigrated to Australia at the age of four, Beynon experienced a hybrid world of two cultures. Beynon’s work is centered on her mixed heritage as an Australian with Welsh, English, Chinese, Malaysian, and Norwegian ancestry. Her art’s narratives are inspired by ancient Chinese myths, which she adapts and situates in the modern world. At the start of her career, she experimented with Chinese calligraphy, questioning the notions of race and culture within her own family. Beynon also implements Eastern (manga) and Western comic book styles as a visual genre, and modern graffiti. Her interest in writing as an art form stems from her grandfather, who was a calligrapher and the last person in her family to read and write Chinese. Her first work, "the foolish old man moves the mountain", is a story taken from her grandfather’s book.

Li Ji 
Starting from 1996, Beynon’s work revolved around a fictional character named Li Ji. The character is a heroine adapted from Chinese mythology, who has been transformed to examine hybridity and race. The myth itself is an ancient Chinese story written by Gan Bao, who recorded extraordinary feats imitating historical writing under the “strange tales” genre. The original story revolves around a young Chinese girl who steps out of her traditional, cultural role and saves her village by slaying a giant python. The art critic Maura Reilly states that through Li Ji, Beynon confronts issues about multiculturalism and immigration in contemporary Australian society. Beynon’s work also tackles the modern issues of race and identity. In Where is Your Original Home (a video of Li-Ji journeying across a modern Melbourne Chinatown), Beynon explores the question asked to many non-Anglo Australians: where are you from? She deconstructs how a conversational question can turn hostile caused by the underlying assumptions about belonging.

Beynon is also inspired by her personal experiences in other cultures. During her residency in Harlem, Beynon drew from the neighbourhood’s styles and tastes and implemented them into her depictions of Li Ji (i.e. African hair braiding.) This transformation of Li Ji reflects her fluid, hybrid identity.  Through this representation of Li Ji, Beynon explores issues of cultural identity and perceptions of race.

Exhibitions

Solo 

 2015 – Dance of the Spirits, Sutton Gallery, Melbourne
 2015 – An-Li: A Chinese Ghost Tale, TarraWarra Museum of Art
 2012 – Frida & Friends, Sutton Gallery, Melbourne
 2010 – Transcultural Icons, Sutton Gallery @ Depot, Sydney
 2010 Room of the Talismans, Sutton Gallery Project Space, Melbourne
 2009 Transcultural Creatures, Milani Gallery, Brisbane
 2008 Auspicious Charms for Transcultural Living, Level 2, Art Gallery of New South Wales,
 Sydney
 2007 Espirito Transcultural/ Transcultural Spirit, Sutton Gallery, Melbourne
 2006 Melbourne Art Fair, Sutton Gallery
 2005 Mixed Blood and Migratory Paths, The Physics Room, Christchurch, New Zealand 2004 Harlem to Noco: The
 Hybrid Life of Li Ji, Sutton Gallery, Melbourne
 2003 100 Forms of Happiness/From the Lives of Li Ji, Sutton Gallery, Melbourne
 From the Lives of Li Ji, Bellas Gallery, Brisbane
 From the Dreams of Li Ji, Sutton Gallery, Melbourne
 Calligraffiti Wall, 1st Floor Artists' and Writers' Space, Melbourne
 2002 From the Dreams of Li Ji, Sutton Gallery, Melbourne
 Kate Beynon 1994–2002, Contemporary Art Centre of South Australia, Adelaide
 Calligraffiti Wall, 1st Floor Artists’ and Writers’ Space, Melbourne
 2001 Chinese Calligraffiti, Studio 12, 200 Gertrude Street, Melbourne Li Ji: Warrior Girl, Gallery 4A, Asia-Australia
 Arts Centre, Sydney
 2000 Li Ji: Warrior Girl, Sutton Gallery, Melbourne Li Ji: Warrior Girl, Bellas Gallery, Brisbane
 1999 Happiness, Sutton Gallery, Melbourne Hope/Wish, Bellas Gallery, Brisbane
 1998 Intrinsic Defence, 200 Gertrude Street, Melbourne 1997 WHAT people, Sutton Gallery, Melbourne
 1996 Old Folktale, Bellas Gallery, Brisbane
 Li Ji, Sutton Gallery, Melbourne 1995 Old Story, 1st Floor, Melbourne
 1994 Kate Beynon, 1st Floor, Melbourne
 1993 Knots, Bats, Characters, Tala Gallery, Melbourne

Group 

 2007 Global Feminisms, Brooklyn Museum of Art, New York, USA
 SHIFT: places changing, Lake Macquarie City Art Gallery, New South Wales
 Heading North – Contemporary Asian Artists of Australia, Maroondah Art Gallery, Victoria
 Eye to I: the face in recent art, curated by Geoffrey Wallis, Ballarat Art
 Gallery, Victoria
 2006 TarraWarra Biennial 2006 – Parallel Lives: Australian Painting Today, curated
 by Victoria Lynn, TarraWarra Museum, Yarra Valley, Victoria
 The 2006 Archibald Prize, Art Gallery of New South Wales, Sydney; Myer Mural Hall, Melbourne; and touring
 Extra Aesthetic: 25 Views of the Monash University Collection, Monash University Museum of Art, Melbourne
 Meeting Place, Keeping Place, George Adams Gallery, Victorian Arts Centre, Melbourne
 2005 C’town Bling: art and the youth demografik, Campbelltown Arts Centre, Sydney
 Identity and Desire, Art Gallery of South Australia, Adelaide
 Pitch Your Own Tent: Art Projects/ Store 5/ 1st Floor, Monash University Museum of Art, Melbourne
 MCA Collection: New Acquisitions in Context, Museum of Contemporary Art, Sydney
 A Short Ride in a Fast Machine, Gertrude Contemporary Art Spaces 1985–2005,
 200 Gertrude Street, Melbourne
 Unscripted, Art Gallery of New South Wales, Sydney
 The Plot Thickens: Narratives in Australian Art, Ballarat Fine Art Gallery, Victoria
 Art for Science- fundraiser for Murdoch Children’s Research Institute, Nellie Castan Gallery, Melbourne
 2004 Xin Nian: Contemporary Chinese Australian Art, The Ian Potter Centre: National Gallery of Victoria, Melbourne
 Australia Response Gallery, Melbourne
 The Plot Thickens: Narratives in Australian Art, Heide Museum of Modern Art, Melbourne Home & Away: Place & Identity in Recent Australian Art, Faculty Gallery of Art & Design, Monash University, Melbourne
 Australia Response Gallery, Melbourne
 The Plot Thickens: Narratives in Australian Art, Heide Museum of Modern Art, Melbourne Home & Away: Place & Identity in Recent Australian Art, Faculty Gallery of Art & Design, Monash University, Melbourne
 Curriculum Vitae 2016 – 2 –
 2003 Synergies, Drill Hall, Australian National University, Canberra
 The Future in Every Direction: Joan Clemenger Endowment for Contemporary Australian Art, The Ian Potter Centre: National Gallery of Victoria, Melbourne
 See Here Now: Vizard Foundation Art Collection of the 1990s, Ian Potter Museum of Art, The University of Melbourne
 The Arthur Guy Memorial Painting Prize, Bendigo Art Gallery, Victoria
 2002 Upstream: 400 Years of the Dutch East Indies Company, Australian Representative, Amsterdam and Hoorn, The Netherlands
 Fieldwork: Australian Art 1968 – 2002, The Ian Potter Centre: National Gallery of Victoria, Melbourne
 Energy Fields: Selected Installations from the Monash University Collection,
 Monash University Museum of Art, Melbourne.
 Tales of the Unexpected, National Gallery of Australia, Canberra
 No Worries! – Mai Pen Rai! Art From Australia and Thailand, Monash University Museum of Art, Melbourne
 City of Hobart Art Prize, Tasmanian Art Gallery and Museum, Hobart
 Watching Ocean and Sky Together, Fourth Wall Liverpool, Liverpool Biennial, presented by The Public Art Development Trust, London, UK
 2001 Our Place: Issues of Identity in Recent Australian Art, Monash University in Prato, Palazzo Vaj, Italy
 hybrid<life>forms: Australian New Media Art, Netherlands Media Art Institute, Amsterdam, The Netherlands
 31st Alice Prize, Araluen Centre, Alice Springs
 Short Soup; Sydney Asia Pacific Film Festival, Sydney
 Asia in Australia: Beyond Orientalism, QUT Art Museum, Brisbane
 Paperworks: Australian artists exploring drawing and the printed image, Queensland Art Gallery, Brisbane
 MCA Unpacked, Museum of Contemporary Art, Sydney
 Gertrude Studio Artists 2001, 200 Gertrude Street, Melbourne
 STOP/FRAME, New England Regional Art Museum, Armidale, New South Wales CACSA Fundraiser, Contemporary Art Centre of South Australia, Adelaide
 Bellas Gallery Group Exhibition, Bellas Gallery, Brisbane
 1st Floor Fundraiser, 1st Floor, Melbourne
 2000 Pragmatics of Inscription: Wall Drawings, Linden Gallery, Melbourne
 Rent, Australian Centre for Contemporary Art, Melbourne; and Overgaden Gallery, Copenhagen, Denmark
 Gertrude Street Studio Artists 2000, 200 Gertrude Street, Melbourne
 Facsimile, Plimsoll Gallery, Hobart; and Bendigo Art Gallery, Victoria
 1999 Perspecta 99, Talkback: Living Here Now – Art & Politics, Art Gallery of New South Wales, Sydney
 Facsimile, curated by Stuart Koop, LAC Gallery, Venezuela
 The Queen is Dead, Stills Gallery, Edinburgh, Scotland
 Diaphanous, Span Gallery, Melbourne; and Nokia Singapore Arts Festival,
 Caldwell House Gallery, Chijmes, Singapore
 Look Again: Contemporary Prints and Drawings from the Collection, National Gallery of Victoria, Melbourne
 Flux, Arts Victoria, Melbourne
 1998 The Expanded Field, Monash University Gallery, Melbourne Alter Point, 1st Floor, Melbourne
 Special Issue, 1st Floor, Melbourne
 Mr Big and Friends, Museum of Contemporary Art, Sydney
 1st Floor Artists, The Physics Room, Christchurch, New Zealand
 Objectivity: International Objects of Subjectivity, Contemporary Art Centre of Virginia, USA
 1997 Blackphoenix with Michael Pablo, 1st Floor, Melbourne
 Moët & Chandon Exhibition, Queensland Art Gallery; and touring nationally Gallery 4A Fundraiser, Sydney
 Now and Then, Bellas Gallery, Brisbane
 1st Floor Fundraiser, 1st Floor, Melbourne
 1996 Primavera 1996, Museum of Contemporary Art, Sydney
 Deacons Graham & James/Arts 21 Award, Ian Potter Gallery, The University of Melbourne
 Above and Beyond: Austral/Asian Interactions, Australian Centre for Contemporary Art, Melbourne; and touring
 nationally
 AERPHOST, The Debtors’ Prison, Dublin, Ireland
 Heirloom, Next Wave Festival, Monash University Gallery, Melbourne
 Adelaide Biennial of Australian Art, Art Gallery of South Australia, Adelaide
 A Celebration: Recent Acquisitions of Heritage and Contemporary Art, Art Gallery of South Australia, Adelaide
 Supermodels, Next Wave Festival, 1st Floor, Melbourne
 S.W.I.M. Fundraiser, Project Space, RMIT, Melbourne
 1995  Artist Editions, Sutton Gallery, Melbourne; and Bellas Gallery, Brisbane 1st Floor Fundraiser Exhibition, 1st
 Floor, Melbourne
 Kate Beynon, Maria Griffin, Megan Marshall, Jessica Rankin, Fringe Festival, 1st Floor,
 Melbourne
 1994 1st Floor Fundraiser Exhibition, 1st Floor, Melbourne
 Intimate, with Maria Griffin and Megan Marshall, Nextwave Festival, Linden Gallery, Melbourne
 Read My Lips, curated by Shiralee Saul, M.R.C Ascent Gallery, Melbourne; and Union Gallery, Adelaide
 1st Floor Group Show Two, 1st Floor, Melbourne
 1993   VCA Graduate Exhibition, Victorian College of the Arts, Melbourne
 Inside, with Maria Griffin and Megan Marshall, Victorian College of the Arts, Melbourne
 1992  Learning, curated by Jenny Zimmer and Gail Hastings, Monash Studios, Nextwave Festival, Melbourne
 Festival of Art – VCA at the Malthouse, The Malthouse, Melbourne
 1991 The Double Lucky Ho-Ho, with Wai-Ling Lai, Victorian College of the Arts, Melbourne

Collections 

 American University, Washington DC, USA Artbank, Sydney
 Art Gallery of New South Wales, Sydney Art Gallery of South Australia, Adelaide
 Art Gallery of Western Australia, Perth
 The Australia Council, the Federal Government’s art funding and advisory body, Sydney Bendigo Art Gallery, Victoria
 BHP Billiton, Melbourne
 Curtin University, Perth
 Goldman Sachs JB Were, Sydney
 Griffith University, Brisbane
 Hamilton Art Gallery, Hamilton, Victoria
 Holmesglen Institute of TAFE, Melbourne
 Mercer Collection, Melbourne
 Michael and Janet Buxton Collection, Melbourne
 Monash University Collection, Melbourne
 Museum of Contemporary Art, Sydney
 The Museum of Modern Art (MMK), Frankfurt, Germany
 National Gallery of Australia, Canberra
 National Gallery of Victoria, Melbourne
 UQ Art Museum, Brisbane
 Queensland Art Gallery, Brisbane
 Vizard Foundation, The University of Melbourne
 Wesley Hospital, Brisbane
 Private collections in Australia, New Zealand and USA

References

Australian artists
1970 births
Living people
Archibald Prize finalists